Giuseppe Mangione (1908–1976) was an Italian screenwriter.

Selected filmography
 Headlights in the Fog (1942)
 In the Name of the Law (1949)
 Barrier to the North (1950)
 Against the Law (1950)
 Red Seal (1950)
 Black Fire (1951)
 The Crossroads (1951)
 Son of the Hunchback (1952)
 The Legend of the Piave (1952)
 Tragic Return (1952)
 Cavalcade of Song (1953)
 Jealousy (1953)
 Angels of Darkness (1954)
 Tripoli, Beautiful Land of Love (1954)
 Proibito (1954)
 Wild Love (1955)
 Songs of Italy (1955)
 Red and Black (1955)
 The Widow (1955)
 Andalusia Express (1956)
 Desert Warrior (1957)
 Sheba and the Gladiator (1959)
 Vento del sud (1959)
 Ursus (1960)
 Mole Men Against the Son of Hercules (1961)
 Commando (1962)
 Misunderstood (1966)
 A Man for Emmanuelle (1969)

References

Bibliography
 Davis, Ronald L. Hollywood Beauty: Linda Darnell and the American Dream. University of Oklahoma Press, 2014.

External links

1908 births
1976 deaths
20th-century Italian screenwriters
Italian male screenwriters
Film people from Rome
20th-century Italian male writers